The Stedman & Fuller Manufacturing Company Complex also known as the Bourn Rubber Company, Philips-Baker Rubber Company Complex is a historical manufacturing complex at 49 Westfield Street in the West End neighborhood of Providence, Rhode Island.

It was added to the National Register of Historic Places in 2021 for its association with locally significant manufacturing companies.

See also 

 National Register of Historic Places listings in Providence, Rhode Island

References 

Industrial buildings and structures on the National Register of Historic Places in Rhode Island
Buildings and structures in Providence, Rhode Island
Industrial buildings and structures in Rhode Island
National Register of Historic Places in Providence, Rhode Island